Esther Dierkes (born 9 February 1990) is a German operatic, concert and lied soprano.

Life and career 
Born in Münster, Dierkes received her first voice lessons at the age of 13. She achieved first prize in the national competition Jugend musiziert. From 2009 to 2015, she studied opera singing at the Frankfurt University of Music and Performing Arts in Hedwig Fassbender's class.

The concert with works by Arnold Schoenberg, Franz Schubert, Alban Berg and Max Reger was broadcast by the radio station WDR 3 under the title .

Dierkes attended master classes with Gerd Uecker, Rudolf Piernay, Edith Wiens and Helmut Deutsch. She is a regular guest at the Kölner Philharmonie, Berliner Philharmonie, Gewandhaus Leipzig, the Alte Oper Frankfurt and worked with conductors such as Hartmut Haenchen, Sylvain Cambreling, Risto Joost, Marc Soustrot, Andrew Manze, Ulf Schirmer and Bertrand de Billy.

Since the 2017/18 season, Dierkes has been a member of the ensemble of the Staatstheater Stuttgart, where she appeared as  Venus in Offenbach's Orpheus in the Underworld and Zerlina in Mozart's Don Giovanni.

References

External links 
 
 Esther Dierkes on Operabase
 Esther Dierkes (articles) Neue Musikzeitung (in German)
 Ester Dierkes, das-podium.de (in German)

German operatic sopranos
21st-century German women opera singers
1990 births
Living people
People from Münster